Mamaroneck High School is a public school located in Mamaroneck, New York. The school is part of the Mamaroneck Union Free School District. Students residing in neighboring Larchmont also attend this school.

Ranking
Mamaroneck High school is unranked in U.S. News & World Report List of Best High Schools of 2012. However, its score of 55.2 in terms of college readiness places it with the same rating as a rank of #262. In the U.S. News & World Report List of Best High Schools in 2017, it is ranked #242 in National High Schools.

Curriculum
Mamaroneck High School offers a variety of Advanced Placement classes to upperclassmen. Students are allowed to take AP US History, AP English Language and AP Physics 1 as early as their junior year. Seniors can select from AP European History, AP Macroeconomics, AP Government, AP English Literature, AP Physics C, AP Biology, AP Environmental Science, AP Computer Science A, AP Calculus AB, AP Calculus BC, AP French, and AP Spanish Language. Students also have the option to submit an AP Studio Art portfolio in either Drawing and Painting, Photography, or Clay. In 2010, 2.415 AP tests were taken per graduating senior, and this garnered a ranking of 452 on Newsweek's annual list of Americas Best High Schools.

In addition, the High School also offers a large number of dual-enrollment courses. These include Introduction to Sociology administered by Syracuse University, College Composition by Iona College, as well as Intermediate Spanish/French/Chinese, Introduction Creative Writing, a three-year program in Original Science Research with SUNY Albany and a four program in Original Civc Research and Action.

Speech and Debate
Mamaroneck High School has a Speech and Debate team, though the school only offers policy debate and does not compete in any speech events. The high school participates in local and state, as well as national tournaments. In 2019 and 2021, the Mamaroneck policy debate team won the New York state championship. In addition to attending tournaments in other schools, Mamaroneck High School hosts its own annual NY Fall Faceoff tournament.

Notable alumni

 Gerald B. Appel  - celebrity nephrologist
Fred Berger - movie producer
 Elizabeth Berridge - actress
 Susan Dentzer - journalist
 Kevin Dillon - actor
 Matt Dillon (attended, but dropped out)  - actor
 Dan Engel - software entrepreneur
 Dan Futterman - actor
Rob Gardner (attended for part of 9th grade before moving to Los Angeles) - The original drummer and one of the founding members of the rock band, "Guns N' Roses" also a founding member of "LA Guns"
 Al Giordano - journalist
Thomas Hauser - author
 Tor Hyams - musician
 Elizabeth Kolbert - journalist
 Danny Kortchmar - musician
 Scott Leius - professional Major League Baseball player for Twins, Indians, and Royals.
 Bennett Miller - director
 Jill Novick - actress
 Michael O'Keefe - actor
 Norman Rockwell (attended, but transferred) - artist
 David O. Russell - director
Jeff Weiner - CEO of LinkedIn
Emily Wickersham - actress
Lina Khan - Commissioner of the Federal Trade Commission (FTC) since 2021

Notes

References

Mamaroneck, New York
Public high schools in Westchester County, New York